Tatyana Menshova (born 27 January 1970) is a retired Russian female volleyball player. She played for the Unified Team.

She competed at the 1992 Summer Olympics and for the Russia women's national volleyball team at the 1996 Summer Olympics. 

She was also  part of the Russia women's national volleyball team winning the European title at the 1993 Women's European Volleyball Championship and 1997 Women's European Volleyball Championship. 
On club level she played with Uralochka Yekaterinburg.

Clubs
 Uralochka Yekaterinburg (1994)

References

External links
 
www.legavolleyfemminile.it
www.cev.lu
Getty Images

1970 births
Living people
Kazakhstani women's volleyball players
Russian women's volleyball players
Soviet women's volleyball players
Volleyball players at the 1992 Summer Olympics
Volleyball players at the 1996 Summer Olympics
Olympic volleyball players of the Unified Team
Olympic volleyball players of Russia
People from Temirtau